The U.S. Soccer Player of the Year is given by the United States Soccer Federation to the American soccer players judged best in the calendar year. It is considered the highest accolade for American soccer players.

The U.S. Soccer Male Player of the Year award originated in 1984, followed by the Female Player of the Year in 1985. Awards for Young Male and Young Female Players were added in 1998. An award for Player of the Year with a Disability was added in 2012 but discontinued after 2020 and replaced with the non-player-specific "ADAPTandTHRIVE Disability Award," which "recognizes an individual making an impact in the United States' broad landscape of disability soccer." In 2021, awards for female and male beach soccer as well as futsal are added.

Public voting for the awards account for 50 percent of the results. The other 50 percent are voted by members of the national media and U.S. Soccer representatives (from national team coaches to the National Board of Directors).

U.S. Soccer Players of the Year

See also

 List of sports awards honoring women
 Athlete of the Year
 Fútbol de Primera Player of the Year

References

External links
 U.S. Soccer Player of the Year Award

US
American soccer trophies and awards
1984 establishments in the United States
Awards established in 1984
Annual events in the United States
Women's association football player of the year awards